Part of the Occupy movement that started as Occupy Wall Street, the Occupy movement in California has had several protests which have reached mainstream media for their involvement including: Occupy Oakland, Occupy San Francisco, Occupy San Jose and Occupy Sacramento. Several universities took part in the protests as well, including notable protests Occupy UC Davis and Occupy Cal. Below are some of the protest locations in California within the larger list of locations in the United States. It is the state with the most community protests, manifesting in over 50 cities and also on many college campuses.

List

Gallery

See also 

 

 List of Occupy movement protest locations
 List of Occupy movement protest locations in the United States
 Timeline of Occupy Wall Street
 We are the 99%
Other U.S. protests
 2011 United States public employee protests
 2011 Wisconsin protests

 
Other international protests
 15 October 2011 global protests
 2010–2011 Greek protests
 2011 Chilean protests
 2011 Israeli social justice protests
 2011 United Kingdom anti-austerity protests and 2010 UK student protests
 Iceland Kitchenware Revolution
 Spanish 15M Indignants movement

 

Related articles
 Bank Transfer Day
 Corruption Perceptions Index
 Economic inequality
 Grassroots movement
 Impact of the Arab Spring
 Income inequality in the United States
 List of countries by distribution of wealth
 List of countries by income equality
 Plutocracy
 Wealth inequality in the United States

References

Occupy movement protest locations
Occupy movement protest locations in California
Articles containing video clips
Occupy movement protest locations